Sydney John Bennett (7 February 1905 – 15 August 1969) was an English cricketer.  Bennett was a right-handed batsman who bowled right-arm slow.  He was born at Hackleton, Northamptonshire.

Bennett made three first-class appearances for Northamptonshire, two in the 1933 County Championship against Nottinghamshire and Derbyshire, and one in the 1934 County Championship against Leicestershire.  In his three first-class matches, he scored 37 runs at an average of 7.40, with a high score of 19 not out.  With the ball he took 2 wickets at a bowling average of 53.50, with best figures of 1/40.

He died at Margate, Kent on 15 August 1969.

References

External links
Sydney Bennett at ESPNcricinfo
Sydney Bennett at CricketArchive

1905 births
1969 deaths
People from West Northamptonshire District
English cricketers
Northamptonshire cricketers